Beyond Price is a 1921 American silent drama film directed by J. Searle Dawley and starring Pearl White, Vernon Steele and Ottola Nesmith.

Cast
 Pearl White as 	Sally Marrio
 Vernon Steele as Philip Marrio 
 Nora Reed as Valicia
 Arthur Gordini as Lester Lawton
 Louis Haines as J. Peter Weatherby
 Maude Turner Gordon as Mrs. Florence Weathersby
 Byron Douglas as Norbert Temple
 Ottola Nesmith as Mrs. Temple
 Dorothy Walters as Mrs. Dusenberry
 Dorothy Allen as Lizzie
 Jack Baston as 	Mrs. Temple's Friend 
 Charles Sutton as Cobbler

References

Bibliography
 Munden, Kenneth White. The American Film Institute Catalog of Motion Pictures Produced in the United States, Part 1. University of California Press, 1997.

External links
 

1921 films
1921 drama films
1920s English-language films
American silent feature films
Silent American drama films
Films directed by J. Searle Dawley
American black-and-white films
Fox Film films
1920s American films